Way Out Yonder is the twelfth album released by the Sons of the San Joaquin.  It was made available through their website in October 2005, and saw a worldwide release in January of the following year.

Track listing

Personnel

Sons of the San Joaquin

Jack Hannah
Joe Hannah
Lon Hannah

Additional personnel

Tim Johnson, Steve Story, Randy Elmore, Richard Chon - fiddles
Ginny Mae - accordion
Ronny Shultz, Kevin Sherbon - trumpets
Dennis Mack, Ronnie Ellis, Mark Abbott - bass
Rich O'Brien - guitar, dobro, banjo, mandolin, percussion

Production

Recorded at:
Maximus Media, Fresno, CA
Eric Sherbon - engineer
Casey Jones Recording, Burleson, TX
Aarom Meador - engineer
Western Jubilee Warehouse, Colorado Springs, CO
Butch Hause - engineer
Rich O'Brien - producer
Russ Pate - assistant producer
Mastered at Airshow Mastering, Boulder, CO
David Glasser - mastering
Scott O'Malley & Associates, LLC - artist representation

Notes

This album is dedicated to the memory of Joe Hannah's late wife, Kay.
Two of the songs were cowritten with Bill Thornbury, who sometimes tours with the group and is best known for his role as Jody Pearson in several of the Phantasm films.

External links
Official site

References

2005 albums
Sons of the San Joaquin albums